

Infantry units
In recognition of Illinois’ six regiments' service in the Mexican War, regimental numbers for infantry in the Civil War began at seven.

7th Illinois Infantry Regiment
8th Illinois Infantry Regiment
9th Illinois Infantry Regiment
10th Illinois Infantry Regiment
11th Illinois Infantry Regiment
12th Illinois Infantry Regiment
13th Illinois Infantry Regiment
14th Illinois Infantry Regiment
15th Illinois Infantry Regiment
16th Illinois Infantry Regiment
17th Illinois Infantry Regiment
18th Illinois Infantry Regiment
19th Illinois Infantry Regiment
20th Illinois Infantry Regiment
21st Illinois Infantry Regiment
22nd Illinois Infantry Regiment
23rd Illinois Infantry Regiment
24th Illinois Infantry Regiment
25th Illinois Infantry Regiment
26th Illinois Infantry Regiment
27th Illinois Infantry Regiment
28th Illinois Infantry Regiment
29th Illinois Infantry Regiment
29th United States Colored Infantry Regiment
30th Illinois Infantry Regiment
31st Illinois Infantry Regiment
32nd Illinois Infantry Regiment
33rd Illinois Infantry Regiment
34th Illinois Infantry Regiment
35th Illinois Infantry Regiment
36th Illinois Infantry Regiment
37th Illinois Infantry Regiment
38th Illinois Infantry Regiment
39th Illinois Infantry Regiment
40th Illinois Infantry Regiment
41st Illinois Infantry Regiment
42nd Illinois Infantry Regiment
43rd Illinois Infantry Regiment
44th Illinois Infantry Regiment
45th Illinois Infantry Regiment
46th Illinois Infantry Regiment
47th Illinois Infantry Regiment
48th Illinois Infantry Regiment
49th Illinois Infantry Regiment
50th Illinois Infantry Regiment
51st Illinois Infantry Regiment
52nd Illinois Infantry Regiment
53rd Illinois Infantry Regiment
54th Illinois Infantry Regiment
55th Illinois Infantry Regiment
56th Illinois Infantry Regiment
57th Illinois Infantry Regiment
58th Illinois Infantry Regiment
59th Illinois Infantry Regiment
60th Illinois Infantry Regiment
61st Illinois Infantry Regiment
62nd Illinois Infantry Regiment
63rd Illinois Infantry Regiment
64th Illinois Infantry Regiment
65th Illinois Infantry Regiment
66th Illinois Infantry Regiment
67th Illinois Infantry Regiment
68th Illinois Infantry Regiment
69th Illinois Infantry Regiment
70th Illinois Infantry Regiment
71st Illinois Infantry Regiment
72nd Illinois Infantry Regiment
73rd Illinois Infantry Regiment
74th Illinois Infantry Regiment
75th Illinois Infantry Regiment
76th Illinois Infantry Regiment
77th Illinois Infantry Regiment
78th Illinois Infantry Regiment
79th Illinois Volunteer Infantry Regiment
80th Illinois Volunteer Infantry Regiment
81st Illinois Volunteer Infantry Regiment
82nd Illinois Volunteer Infantry Regiment
83rd Illinois Volunteer Infantry Regiment
84th Illinois Volunteer Infantry Regiment
85th Illinois Volunteer Infantry Regiment
86th Illinois Volunteer Infantry Regiment
87th Illinois Volunteer Infantry Regiment
88th Illinois Volunteer Infantry Regiment
89th Illinois Volunteer Infantry Regiment
90th Illinois Volunteer Infantry Regiment
91st Illinois Volunteer Infantry Regiment
92nd Illinois Volunteer Infantry Regiment
93rd Illinois Volunteer Infantry Regiment
94th Illinois Volunteer Infantry Regiment
95th Illinois Volunteer Infantry Regiment
96th Illinois Volunteer Infantry Regiment
97th Illinois Volunteer Infantry Regiment
98th Illinois Volunteer Infantry Regiment
99th Illinois Volunteer Infantry Regiment
100th Illinois Volunteer Infantry Regiment
101st Illinois Volunteer Infantry Regiment
102nd Illinois Volunteer Infantry Regiment
103rd Illinois Volunteer Infantry Regiment
104th Illinois Volunteer Infantry Regiment
105th Illinois Volunteer Infantry Regiment
106th Illinois Volunteer Infantry Regiment
107th Illinois Volunteer Infantry Regiment
108th Illinois Volunteer Infantry Regiment
109th Illinois Volunteer Infantry Regiment
110th Illinois Volunteer Infantry Regiment
111th Illinois Volunteer Infantry Regiment
112th Illinois Volunteer Infantry Regiment
113th Illinois Volunteer Infantry Regiment
114th Illinois Volunteer Infantry Regiment
115th Illinois Volunteer Infantry Regiment
116th Illinois Volunteer Infantry Regiment
117th Illinois Volunteer Infantry Regiment
118th Illinois Volunteer Infantry Regiment
119th Illinois Volunteer Infantry Regiment
120th Illinois Volunteer Infantry Regiment
122nd Illinois Volunteer Infantry Regiment
123rd Illinois Volunteer Infantry Regiment
124th Illinois Volunteer Infantry Regiment
125th Illinois Volunteer Infantry Regiment
126th Illinois Volunteer Infantry Regiment
127th Illinois Volunteer Infantry Regiment
128th Illinois Volunteer Infantry Regiment
129th Illinois Volunteer Infantry Regiment
130th Illinois Volunteer Infantry Regiment
131st Illinois Volunteer Infantry Regiment
132nd Illinois Volunteer Infantry Regiment
133rd Illinois Volunteer Infantry Regiment
134th Illinois Volunteer Infantry Regiment
135th Illinois Volunteer Infantry Regiment
136th Illinois Volunteer Infantry Regiment
137th Illinois Volunteer Infantry Regiment
138th Illinois Volunteer Infantry Regiment
139th Illinois Volunteer Infantry Regiment
140th Illinois Volunteer Infantry Regiment
141st Illinois Volunteer Infantry Regiment
142nd Illinois Volunteer Infantry Regiment
143rd Illinois Volunteer Infantry Regiment
144th Illinois Volunteer Infantry Regiment
145th Illinois Volunteer Infantry Regiment
146th Illinois Volunteer Infantry Regiment
147th Illinois Volunteer Infantry Regiment
148th Illinois Volunteer Infantry Regiment
149th Illinois Volunteer Infantry Regiment
150th Illinois Volunteer Infantry Regiment
151st Illinois Volunteer Infantry Regiment
152nd Illinois Volunteer Infantry Regiment
153rd Illinois Volunteer Infantry Regiment
154th Illinois Volunteer Infantry Regiment
155th Illinois Volunteer Infantry Regiment
156th Illinois Volunteer Infantry Regiment
Sturgis Rifles

Cavalry units

1st Regiment Illinois Volunteer Cavalry
2nd Regiment Illinois Volunteer Cavalry
3rd Regiment Illinois Volunteer Cavalry
4th Regiment Illinois Volunteer Cavalry
5th Regiment Illinois Volunteer Cavalry
6th Regiment Illinois Volunteer Cavalry
7th Regiment Illinois Volunteer Cavalry
8th Regiment Illinois Volunteer Cavalry
9th Regiment Illinois Volunteer Cavalry
10th Regiment Illinois Volunteer Cavalry
11th Regiment Illinois Volunteer Cavalry
12th Regiment Illinois Volunteer Cavalry
13th Regiment Illinois Volunteer Cavalry
14th Regiment Illinois Volunteer Cavalry
15th Regiment Illinois Volunteer Cavalry
16th Regiment Illinois Volunteer Cavalry
17th Regiment Illinois Volunteer Cavalry

Named Units

Barker's Dragoons
Carmichael's Independent Cavalry Company
Dollins' Independent Cavalry Company
Ford's Independent Cavalry Company
Gilbert's Independent Cavalry Company
Hutchins' Independent Cavalry Company
Jenks' Independent Cavalry Company
Dodson's Kane County Independent Cavalry Company
Marx's Independent Cavalry Company
McClellan Dragoons
McClernand's Body Guard
Naughton's Irish Dragoons
O'Harnett's Independent Cavalry Company
Schambeck's Independent Cavalry Company
Sherer's Independent Cavalry Company
Stewart's Independent Cavalry Battalion
Stewart's Independent Cavalry Company
Thielman's Independent Cavalry Battalion
Thielman's Independent Cavalry Company

Mounted infantry units

9th Illinois Volunteer Mounted Infantry Regiment
92nd Illinois Volunteer Mounted Infantry Regiment
98th Illinois Volunteer Mounted Infantry Regiment
123rd Illinois Volunteer Mounted Infantry Regiment

Artillery units

1st Regiment Illinois Volunteer Light Artillery
Battery A
Battery B
Battery C
Battery D
Battery E
Battery F
Battery G
Battery H
Battery I
Battery K
Battery L
Battery M

2nd Regiment Illinois Volunteer Light Artillery
Battery A
Battery B
Battery C
Battery D
Battery E
Battery F
Battery G
Battery H
Battery I
Battery K
Battery L
Battery M

Named Units

Bridges' Battery Illinois Light Artillery
Chicago Board of Trade Independent Battery Light Artillery
Chicago Mercantile Independent Battery Light Artillery
Cogswell's Battery Illinois Light Artillery
Colvin's Battery Illinois Light Artillery
Renwick's Elgin Battery Illinois Light Artillery
Henshaw's Battery Illinois Light Artillery
Springfield Illinois Light Artillery  (Vaughan's)

See also
Lists of American Civil War Regiments by State

References

Plan for Organization of Volunteer Forces

Report of the Adjutant General of the State of Illinois.  This series of books give an overview of all military units provided the State of Illinois and listing of rosters of each unit.

 Volume 1:

 Volume 2:

 Volume 3:

 Volume 4:

 Volume 5:

 Volume 6:

 Volume 7:

 Volume 8:

 
Illinois
Civil War